Microphorinae is a subfamily of flies in the family Dolichopodidae. It is part of an expanded concept of the family, Dolichopodidae sensu lato, though it was previously considered a family of its own.

Genera
The subfamily includes seven genera, two extant and five extinct:
†Avenaphora Grimaldi & Cumming, 1999
†Curvus Kaddumi, 2005 Jordanian amber, Albian
†Meghyperiella Meunier, 1908 Baltic amber, Eocene
Microphor Macquart, 1827
†Microphorites Hennig, 1971 Early Cretaceous-Eocene
†Pristinmicrophor Tang, Shi, Wang & Yang, 2019 Burmese amber, Myanmar, Cenomanian
Schistostoma Becker, 1902

References

External links
 

 
Dolichopodidae subfamilies